Savannah High School is a public high school located in Savannah, Georgia, United States.

Campus
Savannah High is now located at 400 Pennsylvania Avenue.

History

Savannah High School was originally located on Washington Avenue between East and West Atlantic Avenues. The original building, built by the WPA and designed by William Bordley Clarke, Sr., was once the largest public school building in the United States. The foundation of the original building had been built as a luxury hotel, but the owners went bankrupt in the Great Depression and the City of Savannah took over the unfinished building.  The three-story brick and mortar structure included two interior courtyards, one of which held a rifle range for the ROTC as well as several circular interior fire escape slides, which have since been sealed off. The distance around the interior hallway was in excess of one quarter mile. Today, that building houses the Savannah Arts Academy, the only public high school for the arts in Savannah.

Academics
The Savannah High School campus hosts two separate programs of study:
Liberal Studies at Savannah High School
Law and Criminal Justice at Savannah High School

Athletics

Savannah High School has competed in Region 3-AAA since 2016. The school is a member of the Georgia High School Association.

Notable alumni

 Taz Anderson, former professional football player
 Donté Curry, former professional football player
 Pervis Ellison, former NBA basketball player
 Leroy Harris, former professional football player
 Frank Kearse, former professional football player
 Casey Mitchell, basketball player for Elitzur Ashkelon of the Israeli Basketball Premier League
 Avon Riley, former professional football player
 Leah Ward Sears, former Chief Justice of the Georgia Supreme Court
 Jason Shiell, former professional baseball player
 Willie Smith, former professional baseball player for the St. Louis Cardinals
 Richard P. Stanley, Professor of Applied Mathematics at MIT

References

External links
 
 Savannah-Chatham County Public School System website

Public high schools in Georgia (U.S. state)
Schools in Savannah, Georgia